Solon Barnett (March 30, 1921 – July 18, 1998) was a former offensive tackle and guard in the National Football League.

Biography
Barnett was born Solon Slade Barnett Jr. in New Willard, Texas.

Career
Barnett was drafted in the fourteenth round of the 1945 NFL Draft by the Chicago Cardinals and would later be a member of the Green Bay Packers for two seasons. He played at the collegiate level at Baylor University and Southwestern University.

See also
List of Green Bay Packers players

References

1921 births
1998 deaths
Players of American football from Texas
Green Bay Packers players
American football offensive tackles
American football offensive guards
Southwestern Pirates football players
Baylor Bears football players